George McLay MM (1889 – 22 October 1917) was a Scottish professional footballer who played in the Scottish League for Raith Rovers as a wing half.

Personal life 
McLay served as a sergeant in McCrae's Battalion of the Royal Scots during the First World War and saw action at the Battle of the Somme. As McLay advanced near Poelcappelle during the Battle of Passchendaele on 22 October 1917, he became trapped in barbed wire and was shot multiple times, before being shot through the head. He was posthumously awarded the Military Medal for his actions. McLay is commemorated on the Tyne Cot Memorial.

Career statistics

Honours 
 Raith Rovers Hall of Fame

References 

Scottish footballers
1917 deaths
British Army personnel of World War I
British military personnel killed in World War I
1889 births
Royal Scots soldiers
Scottish Football League players
Raith Rovers F.C. players
Footballers from Fife
Association football wing halves
McCrae's Battalion
Recipients of the Military Medal
Deaths by firearm in Belgium
Scottish Junior Football Association players
Wellesley Juniors F.C. players